Solomon Machover (May 23, 1906 - July 1, 1976) was an American psychologist.

Career 
As a young clinician at Bellevue Hospital, Machover collaborated with a small group of activists there (including his future wife Karen Alper) to found the Psychologists League. He was a member of the Communist Party caucus at Bellevue and became the first Chairman of the League. It was a Popular Front group with liberal, socialist and communist members that agitated for jobs and better treatment for psychologists  
Machover became a full professor at SUNY Downstate Medical Center in 1961. In 1971, Machover was the chief psychologist at Kings County Hospital Center.

Awards and honors 
In 1948, Machover became a Fellow of the Society for Projective Techniques and Rorschach Institute, Inc.

Personal life 
In 1936, Machover married psychologist Karen Alper from Minsk, Belarus. They had a son, Robert Machover.

References 

1906 births
1976 deaths
20th-century American psychologists
Scientists from New York City
SUNY Downstate Medical Center faculty